Joe Paterno is a bronze sculpture of Joe Paterno, former head coach of the Penn State Nittany Lions football team. It was located on the northeast side of Beaver Stadium on the campus of the Pennsylvania State University in State College, Pennsylvania until it was removed in 2012 in the aftermath of the Penn State child sex abuse scandal.

Background and description 
The statue was commissioned by friends of Paterno and his wife Sue in recognition of his contributions to the university and was unveiled on November 2, 2001. It was sculpted by Angelo Di Maria of Reading, Pennsylvania and took 2–3 months to complete.

It was accompanied by a stone wall in three sections. The left section of the wall read, "Joseph Vincent Paterno: Educator, Coach, Humanitarian". The center section showed a bas-relief of players running behind Paterno. On the right was a quote from Paterno, "They ask me what I'd like written about me when I'm gone. I hope they write I made Penn State a better place, not just that I was a good football coach." The right section also featured plaques with lists of games Paterno had coached at Penn State from 1966 to 2011.

Removal 
Following the 2011 Penn State child sex abuse scandal, there were widespread calls for the statue to be removed, including by Paterno's friend and longtime Florida State coach Bobby Bowden. At one point, an anonymous individual chartered a plane to fly over State College for several hours with a banner that read Take the Statue Down or We Will.

On July 22, 2012, six months after Paterno's death, the university announced it had removed the statue and "store[d] it in a secure location", citing that it had become a "source of division and an obstacle to healing". The accompanying plaques, bas-relief, and quotations were removed as well. According to Penn State President Rodney Erickson, "were it to remain, the statue will be a recurring wound to the multitude of individuals across the nation and beyond who have been the victims of child abuse".

See also

Other sports-related statues taken down due to controversy
 Statue of Calvin Griffith
 Statue of Jerry Richardson

References

  

2001 sculptures
Bronze sculptures in Pennsylvania
Cultural depictions of American men
Cultural depictions of players of American football
Statue
Penn State Nittany Lions football
Pennsylvania State University campus
Relocated buildings and structures in Pennsylvania
Removed statues
Sculptures of men in Pennsylvania
Statues in Pennsylvania
Statues of sportspeople